Ooho may refer to:
 Ooho, a type of edible water bottle
 Ooho, Japan or Ōho, Japan Ooho, Japan or Ōho, Japan (大保) in Fukuoka Prefecture
 Ooho Station or Ōho Station Ooho Station or Ōho Station (大保駅（おおほ）) rail station on the Tenjin Ōmuta Line

See also
 Ōhō (応保), Japanese era from 1161 to 1163
 Ouhou (歐侯), descent from Yue
 Oho (disambiguation)